"Amen" is a song written by Skip Black, Hannah Blaylock, Catt Gravitt and Gerald O'Brien, and recorded by American country music group Edens Edge. It was released in March 2011 as their debut single and the first from their self-titled album for Big Machine Records.

Critical reception
Matt Bjorke of Roughstock gave the song three and a half stars out of five, calling it an "immediately likable song with a simple yet memorable chorus and a classic-sounding country melody and vocal." Kevin John Coyne of Country Universe gave the song a B+, writing that the vocals "complement the music nicely, and don’t get in the way of telling the story."

Music video
The music video was directed by Roman White and premiered in May 2011.

Chart performance
"Amen" debuted at number 60 on the U.S. Billboard Hot Country Songs chart for the week of April 9, 2011. It also debuted at number 99 on the U.S. Billboard Hot 100 chart for the week of December 24, 2011.

Year-end charts

References

2011 debut singles
2011 songs
Edens Edge songs
Music videos directed by Roman White
Songs written by Catt Gravitt
Song recordings produced by Mark Bright (record producer)
Big Machine Records singles